The meridian 112° west of Greenwich is a line of longitude that extends from the North Pole across the Arctic Ocean, North America, the Pacific Ocean, the Southern Ocean, and Antarctica to the South Pole.

The 112th meridian west forms a great circle with the 68th meridian east.

From Pole to Pole
Starting at the North Pole and heading south to the South Pole, the 112th meridian west passes through:

{| class="wikitable plainrowheaders"
! scope="col" width="130" | Co-ordinates
! scope="col" | Country, territory or sea
! scope="col" | Notes
|-
| style="background:#b0e0e6;" | 
! scope="row" style="background:#b0e0e6;" | Arctic Ocean
| style="background:#b0e0e6;" |
|-
| 
! scope="row" | 
| Northwest Territories — Borden Island
|-
| style="background:#b0e0e6;" | 
! scope="row" style="background:#b0e0e6;" | Wilkins Strait
| style="background:#b0e0e6;" |
|-
| 
! scope="row" | 
| Northwest Territories — Mackenzie King Island
|-
| style="background:#b0e0e6;" | 
! scope="row" style="background:#b0e0e6;" | Unnamed waterbody
| style="background:#b0e0e6;" |
|-
| 
! scope="row" | 
| Northwest Territories — Melville Island
|-
| style="background:#b0e0e6;" | 
! scope="row" style="background:#b0e0e6;" | Liddon Gulf
| style="background:#b0e0e6;" |
|-
| 
! scope="row" | 
| Northwest Territories — Melville Island
|-
| style="background:#b0e0e6;" | 
! scope="row" style="background:#b0e0e6;" | Parry Channel
| style="background:#b0e0e6;" | Viscount Melville Sound
|-valign="top"
| 
! scope="row" | 
|-
| style="background:#b0e0e6;" | 
! scope="row" style="background:#b0e0e6;" | Coronation Gulf
| style="background:#b0e0e6;" |
|-
| 
! scope="row" | 
| Nunavut — Duke of York Archipelago
|-
| style="background:#b0e0e6;" | 
! scope="row" style="background:#b0e0e6;" | Coronation Gulf
| style="background:#b0e0e6;" |
|-valign="top"
| 
! scope="row" | 
|-valign="top"
| 
! scope="row" | 
|-
| 
! scope="row" | 
| Sonora
|-
| style="background:#b0e0e6;" | 
! scope="row" style="background:#b0e0e6;" | Gulf of California
| style="background:#b0e0e6;" | 
|-
| 
! scope="row" | 
| Baja California Sur
|-
| style="background:#b0e0e6;" | 
! scope="row" style="background:#b0e0e6;" | Magdalena Bay
| style="background:#b0e0e6;" |
|-
| 
! scope="row" | 
| Baja California Sur — Isla Santa Margarita
|-valign="top"
| style="background:#b0e0e6;" | 
! scope="row" style="background:#b0e0e6;" | Pacific Ocean
| style="background:#b0e0e6;" | Passing just east of Roca Partida, Revillagigedo Islands,  at 
|-
| style="background:#b0e0e6;" | 
! scope="row" style="background:#b0e0e6;" | Southern Ocean
| style="background:#b0e0e6;" |
|-
| 
! scope="row" | Antarctica
| Unclaimed territory
|-
|}

See also
111th meridian west
113th meridian west

w112 meridian west